¡Viva! Los Straitjackets is the second studio album by American instrumental rock band Los Straitjackets, released in June 1996 by Upstart Records. It was recorded in January 1996 in Los Angeles, California, produced by Ben Vaughn and engineered by Mark Linett.

Track listing

Personnel
Los Straitjackets
Danny Amis – guitar
Eddie Angel – guitar
Scott Esbeck – bass
Jimmy Lester –  drums, triangle
Additional personnel
Ben Vaughn – production, guitar
Mark Linett – engineering
Brad Talbott – artwork
Jim Hagans – photography

References

Los Straitjackets albums
1996 albums